= Hans Ferlitsch =

Austrian politician (born 1946)

Hans Maximillion Ferlitsch (born August 19, 1946) was the 37th Municipality Association president and mayor of St. Stefan, Austria serving from 1993 to 2003. He has served five terms as the governor of St. Stefan and is currently vice-president of the Social Democratic Party He may be one of the most well known mayors from Stefan for his works in the suppliance of Austria with broadband. Ferlitsch has been closely associating with the telecommunications industry for quite a while, as some had expected. This only led to controversy over his actions, though he managed to become vice-president in 2003. Although he was one of the municipality's youngest mayors and appeared to be a sketchy figure, he ended his term with a 92% approval rating, one of the highest in Austria's history.

== Early years ==
Hans was the fourth child born in a family of 13 children. His only known siblings are Martin, Franz, Leiver, Frank, Maxwell, Lieptcin, and Fruer. He was raised on a farm with his parents, Greta and Michael. He attended a small school in Salzburg of 60 students. Out of his siblings, he was the brightest and most promising, and moved on to a 4-year university. From this he went on to work at Klommpen, an Austrian trade firm, where he was employed as project manager. From then on, he was offered a job dealing with foreign affairs, as he was recognized for his speech and fluency in German and English.
